United Nations Security Council Resolution 135, adopted on May 27, 1960, after a failed meeting between the Heads of State of France, the Union of Soviet Socialist Republics, the United Kingdom and the United States, the Council recommended those governments seek solutions of existing international problems by negotiation or other peaceful means as provided in the Charter of the United Nations.  The resolution pleaded with them to refrain from the use of threats of force, to seek disarmament in accordance with United Nations General Assembly Resolution 1378, to discontinue all nuclear weapons tests and to avail themselves to the assistance of the Council and any other appropriate UN organs to render these ends.

Resolution 135 was adopted by nine votes to none; the People's Republic of Poland and Soviet Union abstained.

See also
List of United Nations Security Council Resolutions 101 to 200 (1953–1965)

References 
Text of the Resolution at undocs.org

External links
 

 0135
 0135
 0135
 0135
 0135
Soviet Union–United Kingdom relations
France–Soviet Union relations
Soviet Union–United States relations
United Kingdom–United States relations
1960 in the United Kingdom
1960 in the United States
1960 in the Soviet Union
1960 in France
France–United States relations
France–United Kingdom relations
May 1960 events